Chris Shaffer is a singer/songwriter from Indiana who is best known as the frontman of The Why Store and their biggest single, "Lack of Water." Shaffer performed with The Why Store until it split in 2000 and was among the members who reunited in 2005 for a handful of reunion shows.

Shaffer has remained continuously active in the Indiana music scene. After The Why Store disbanded in 2000, Shaffer continued writing and performing new music. His first project, Shaffer Street, included his then wife, Heather Marie Shaffer, who contributed vocals and songwriting. After a number of incarnations, Shaffer eventually began to simply use the name "Chris Shaffer." Since 2007, Shaffer has fronted a new band named The Why Store, though it features no other original members.

Discography

with The Why Store
 Welcome To The Why Store, 1993
 Inside The Why Store, 1994
 The Why Store, 1996
 Two Beasts, 1998
 Live At Midnight, 1999
 Life On Planet Six Ball, 2000
 Vim, 2009

with Shaffer Street
 Four Walls, 2000
 No Way Back, 2002

Solo
 Chris Shaffer, 2003
 Vim, 2007

Members 
 Chris Shaffer: Lead Vocalist, Guitar
 Troy Seele: Guitar
 Dan Hunt: Bass
 Jerome Rieskamp: Drums

References

External links
MySpace Profile
The Chris Shaffer Archive

American singer-songwriters
Living people
Year of birth missing (living people)